In Marxism, bourgeois nationalism is the practice by the ruling classes of deliberately dividing people by nationality, race, ethnicity, or religion, so as to distract them from engaging in class struggle. It is seen as a divide-and-conquer strategy used by the ruling classes to prevent the working class from uniting against them; hence the Marxist slogan, Workers of all countries, unite!

Usage

Soviet Union 

After the October Revolution, the Bolshevik government based its nationalities policy (korenization) on the principles of Marxism. According to these principles, all nations should disappear with time, and nationalism was considered a bourgeois ideology. By the mid-1930s these policies were replaced with more extreme assimilationist and russification policies.

In his Report on the 50th anniversary of the formation of the USSR, Leonid Brezhnev emphasized: "That is why Communists and all fighters for socialism believe that the main aspect of the national question is unification of the working people, regardless of their national origin, in the common battle against every type of oppression, and for a new social system which rules out exploitation of the working people."

China 

Bourgeois nationalism as a concept was discussed by China's president, Liu Shaoqi as follows:

See also 
 Class collaboration
 Liberal nationalism
 Lenin's national policy
 Proletarian internationalism, an antonym of bourgeois nationalism.

References

Further reading 
 Internationalism and Nationalism by Liu Shaoqi
 Marxism and Nationalism by Tom Lewis

Ideology of the Communist Party of the Soviet Union
Soviet phraseology
Marxist terminology
Political science terminology
Nationalism
Anti-nationalism
Diversionary tactics
Conflict (process)
Power (social and political) concepts
Bourgeoisie